The zec Saint-Patrice is a "zone d'exploitation contrôlée" (controlled harvesting zone) (ZEC) along the Ottawa River of 28 km below Rapides-des-Joachims, in Pontiac Regional County Municipality, in the administrative region of Outaouais, in Quebec, in Canada.

Geography 

Zec shares its boundary with the Zec de Rapides-des-Joachims, James-Little Ecological Reserve and Ruisseau-de-l'Indien Ecological Reserve. Its territory is including the Old forest of River Schyan.

Its area was both narrowed southeast and increased specifically north of Lac Saint-Patrice, a very large body of water, which the zec gets its name. The serpentine Noire River serves as a boundary to the north, and Aumond Creek at the northwest end.

Of the hundreds of hunting and fishing lodges in the ZEC, a large number of them are around Lake Saint-Patrice.

See also

Related articles 
 Pontiac Regional County Municipality(RCM) 
 Outaouais, administrative region
 Rapides-des-Joachims, municipality 
 Zone d'exploitation contrôlée (Controlled Harvesting Zone) (zec)

References

External links 
 of zec Saint-Patrice

Protected areas of Outaouais
Protected areas established in 1980